The Penmaenmawr & Welsh Granite Co. owned and operated a major granite quarry on the north Wales coast located between Conwy and Llanfairfechan. Granite axe-heads and other implements from Neolithic quarries at Penmaenmawr have been found throughout Britain.

In the 1830s commercial granite quarries were opened on Penmaenmawr to meet the growing demand for granite setts. The granite was lowered from the quarry by self-acting inclines to the  narrow gauge tramway which ran to jetties from where the setts were loaded into ships. The standard gauge Chester to Holyhead railway reached Penmaenmawr in 1848, after which the majority of the quarry output was sent by rail.

The quarry and its internal narrow gauge railway continued to thrive during the nineteenth century. Production at the quarry continues in 2006, though the railway was replaced by trucks in the 1960s.

Locomotives

References

See also
 British industrial narrow gauge railways

Economic history of Wales
History of Conwy County Borough
3 ft gauge railways in Wales
Industrial railways in Wales
Granite companies
Defunct companies of Wales
Penmaenmawr
Closed railway lines in Wales